Henry Astley Darbishire (15 May 1825 – 1899) was a British architect, best known for working on philanthropic schemes. He worked on projects for Angela Burdett-Coutts, and was the architect for the Peabody Trust from 1863 until 1885, when he was succeeded by Victor Wilkins.

He was of Mancunian origin, the son of James Darbishire and his wife Mary Roberts. He qualified as a Fellow of the Royal Institute of British Architects in 1856, and finally retired from practice in 1894.

Darbishire married Eliza Paget in 1858, and they had three children.

Notable works
 Columbia Square, Bethnal Green (1857–60), demolished
 Baroness Burdett Coutts Drinking Fountain, Victoria Park, London (1862)
 Peabody dwellings, Commercial Street, Spitalfields (1864)
 Holly Village, Highgate, London (1865)
 Peabody Estate, Islington (1865)
 Columbia Market, Bethnal Green (1866), demolished
 Peabody Estate, Shadwell (1866)
 Guilford Place drinking fountain (1870)
 Peabody Square, Blackfriars Road, Bermondsey (1871)
 Peabody Estate, Pimlico (1876)
 Peabody Estate, Whitechapel (1881)

References

Further reading
 
 

1825 births
1899 deaths
Architects from Manchester
Fellows of the Royal Institute of British Architects